Vansploitation is a term used for a genre of American independent films from the 1970s in which vans are a "key element to the plot", and that often feature comedic stories about college-age people.

History
The short-lived genre emerged in the United States in the early 1970s, exploiting the popularity of vans with young people, was very popular in the mid to late 1970s, and disappeared in the early 1980s. Vansploitation films were originally made mostly for young audiences. Blue Summer (1973) is credited as the first film of the genre which continued with films like The Van (1977) and Van Nuys Blvd. (1979), the latter having been called "the most technically competent Vansploitation film".

Defining qualities of the genre
Coffman argues that the mere appearance of a van in a film does not make it a vansploitation film. The van has to serve a special purpose in the story, which is summed up in the trailer of Van Nuys Blvd.: "Freedom, fun and fine transportation". Often, vans were highly customized, up to the extent of having an entirely custom body in Supervan. Besides the van itself, van culture (wardrobe, magazines, meetings of van drivers) is also often featured prominently.

The genre follows two earlier ones that also dealt with car-related topics popular in youth culture at their respective times: In the 1950s, films featuring Hot Rods became very popular, and they were followed by motorcycle films in the 1960s (for example, The Wild Angels and Easy Rider). As the popularity of vans in youth culture increased in the early 1970s, the first vansploitation films were created. Multiple factors are credited with creating the "customized van craze". For example, in 1975, the song "Chevy Van" by Sammy Johns sold about three million copies, and is credited for an increase in van sales the following year. The song (among others by Sammy Johns) was used prominently in the soundtrack of The Van (1977).

Notable examples

Coffman names six films as "essential texts" for the vansploitation genre:

1973: Blue Summer (aka Love Truck), directed by Chuck Vincent

1976: C.B. Hustlers, directed by Stu Segall

1977: The Van, directed by Sam Grossman

1977: Supervan, directed by Lamar Card

1978: Mag Wheels (aka Summer School), directed by Bethel Buckalew

1979: Van Nuys Blvd., directed by William Sachs

References

External links
 Jason Coffman: A brief guide to vansploitation cinema

 
 
Film genres
Film genres particular to the United States
Film and video terminology
1970s in film